Wakema Township is a township of Myaungmya District in central Ayeyarwady Region, Myanmar. The first Prime Minister of Burma, U Nu was born in the principal town, Wakema. The township is one of a few townships outside Kayin State with a majority Karen ethnic population.

Wakema Township is bordered to its west by the other townships within its district, Einme Township and Myaungmya Township. To its south, it borders Labutta Township]] and Mawlamyinegyun Township of Labutta District. On its east, it shares a small border with Kyaiklat Township in Pyapon District. To its northeast, it borders Ma-ubin Township and Pantanaw Township in Ma-ubin District. The town consists of one city, 15 urban wards, one town, 125 village tracts and 581 villages.

Geography
Wakema Township is located in the Irrawaddy Delta and is a low-lying area prone to flooding during the monsoon season. There are many freshwater rivers and streams within the township including the Wakema, Shwelaung, Yazutaing and Pyanmalot Rivers. 

71% of the township's land is used for farming with no wild or preserved areas. Flora and fauna are limited to farmlands groves maintained along roads or property lines by residents and government efforts. There are some wild red mangrove trees in inundated lands in the township's south. The township claims that there are no significant wild animals within the town. However, detailed studies have found threatened and near-threatened bird species within the wetlands- the yellow-breasted bunting, the sarus crane and the striated grassbirds. the Jerdon's babbler was rediscovered in the area in 2019 after being last seen within Myanmar in 1941.

Demographics

Wakema Township is relatively rural with 87% of the population living outside the two urban areas- Wakema and Kyonmangay. In 2014, the urban population was only 7.7%. In 2014, 30.3% of the township's population was under the age of 14. There were 95 men for every 100 men in the township. The township has a percentage of working age people when compared nationally. In particular, there is a markedly lower population of people 15-29 years old (born 1985-1999). Furthermore, the town has seen a notable decline in population in the 2010s. 

The majority religion is Buddhism at 91.6% of the population. The second largest religion is Christianity at 3.45%. The township consists of 67,823 households with an average household size of 4.45 persons

Economy and Transport
The township generally has slow economic growth and sees difficulty traveling and trading with neighbouring cities due to lacklustre transportation infrastructure. The primary industry of the township is agriculture with a large majority of the town dedicated to farmland. Like other townships, the primary crop is rice with pulses and chilies as important secondary crops. The pulses of Wakema Township are typically destined for Indonesia where its small, green-coloured grain is well known. The golden apple snail is a prevalent pest that poses one of the most important problems to year-round rice farmers in the township.There are no animal husbandry zones within the township, but the raising of cows, water buffalo, poultry and fish remaining important aspects of the township's agricultural industry. There are several factories and industrial operations in Wakema- predominantly rice milling and fish processing plants.

The township relies primarily on waterways for transport and has no rail connections. There are roadways within the town, but they lacked accessible bridges to nearby cities until the 21st century. The township is connected to the Einme Township across the Kyungon Bridge on the Pyanmalot River. The bridge was opened in 2009 and commissioned on 20 March 2022, by State Administration Council member Aye Nu Sein.

References

Townships of Ayeyarwady Region